Blowin' in from K.C. is an album by saxophonist Joe Thomas and pianist Jay McShann which was recorded in late 1982 and released by the Uptown label in 1983.

Reception

The AllMusic review by Scott Yanow said "There are several exciting selections on this date ... This very rewarding Uptown LP (Joe Thomas' last recording) is a near-classic".

Track listing
All compositions by Joe Thomas except where noted
 "Raw Meat" – 6:05
 "Tearing Hair" (Joe Thomas, George Duvivier) – 5:31
 "What's Your Story Morning Glory" (Jack Lawrence, Paul Francis Webster) – 5:20
 "Star Mist" (Thomas, Duvivier) – 2:47
 "Jumpin' Joe" – 4:30
 "Dog Food" – 5:45
 "If I Could Be with You" (James P. Johnson, Henry Creamer) – 5:20
 "Backstage at the Apollo" – 3:20

Personnel
Joe Thomas – tenor saxophone
Jay McShann – piano
Johnny Grimes – trumpet
Dicky Harris – trombone
Haywood Henry – baritone saxophone
George Duvivier – bass
Oliver Jackson (tracks 1, 2, 5 & 6), Jackie Williams (tracks 3, 4, 7 & 8) – drums
Don Sickler – arranger

References

Uptown Records (jazz) albums
Joe Thomas (tenor saxophonist) albums
Jay McShann albums
1983 albums